The Guilds of Brussels, grouped in the Nine Nations of Brussels, were associations of craft guilds that dominated the economic life of Brussels, Belgium, in the late medieval and early modern periods. From 1421 onwards, they were represented in the city government alongside the patrician lineages of the Seven Noble Houses of Brussels, later also in the States of Brabant as members of the Third Estate. As of 1421, they were also able to become members of the Drapery Court of Brussels. Together with the Seven Noble Houses, they formed the bourgeoisie of the city. Some of their guildhouses can still be seen as part of the UNESCO World Heritage Site of the Grand-Place/Grote Markt in Brussels.

Composition
Rather than being limited to a specific trade, each of the nine "nations" grouped a number of guilds.

These "nations" were:
Nation of Our Lady: butchers, salt-fishmongers, greengrocers, sawyers, goldsmiths and silversmiths.
Nation of St Giles: mercers, victuallers, fruiterers, boatmen, plumbers and fresh-fishmongers.
Nation of St Lawrence: weavers, bleachers, fullers, hatters, tapestry makers and linen weavers.
Nation of St Gery: tailors, stockingmakers, haberdashers, furriers, embroiderers, second-hand clothes dealers and barber surgeons.
Nation of St John: blacksmiths, tinsmiths, farriers, pan smiths, cutlers, locksmiths and watchmakers, painters, goldbeaters and glassmakers, saddlers and harness makers, turners, plasterers and stuccatores, thatchers and basket weavers.
Nation of St Christopher: dyers, cloth shearers, lacemakers and chairmakers.
Nation of St James: bakers and pastry bakers, millers, brewers, coopers, cabinetmakers, tilers and vintners.
Nation of St Peter: glovers, tanners, belt makers, shoemakers and cobblers.
Nation of St Nicholas: armourers and swordsmiths, pedlars, spurriers and gilders, gunsmiths, carpenters, and the stonecutters, masons, sculptors and slaters.

Abolition
The guilds in Brussels, and throughout Belgium, were suppressed in 1795, during the French period of 1794–1815. The furniture and archives of the Brussels guilds were sold at public auction on the Grand-Place in August 1796.

See also
Drapery Court of Brussels
Seven Noble Houses of Brussels
Bourgeois of Brussels
Livery company
Leyniers family
Van der Meulen family
Van Dievoet family

References

History of Brussels
Corporatism
Brussels